WASP-59 is a K-type main-sequence star about 379 light-years away. The star's age is essentially unconstrained by observations. WASP-59 is slightly depleted in heavy elements, having 70% of the solar abundance of iron. The star produces extremely low levels of ultraviolet light, indicating an absence of flare activity.

A multiplicity survey in 2015 did not detect any stellar companions to WASP-59.

Planetary system
In 2012 a transiting hot Jupiter planet b was detected on a tight, mildly eccentric orbit.

The planet is unusually dense for a gas giant, representing an outlier on a mass-radius diagram.

References

Pegasus (constellation)
K-type main-sequence stars
Planetary systems with one confirmed planet
Planetary transit variables
J23182955+2453214